Susan Saint James (born Susan Jane Miller; August 14, 1946) is an American actress and activist, most widely known for her work in television during the 1960s, 1970s and 1980s, especially the detective series McMillan & Wife (1971–1976) and the sitcom Kate & Allie (1984–1989).

Early life
Saint James was born Susan Jane Miller in Los Angeles, California, to a Connecticut family, the daughter of Constance (Geiger) Miller, a teacher, and Charles Daniel Miller, who worked for Mitchell Camera and later became the president of the Testor Corporation. Saint James was raised in Rockford, Illinois, where she began modeling as a teenager. In her younger school years she attended the Woodlands Academy of the Sacred Heart in Lake Forest, Illinois. She later attended the Connecticut College for Women.

Career
Saint James's first screen role was in the TV movie Fame Is the Name of the Game (1966) with Tony Franciosa, launching her career when it became a series two years later.  Among her other early television appearances were two episodes of the first season of Ironside ("Girl in the Night", December 1967 and two months later, playing a different role in the episode "Something for Nothing"). She also had a supporting role in Where Angels Go, Trouble Follows (1968), the sequel to The Trouble with Angels.

From 1968 to 1971, as a result of her first role in Fame Is the Name of the Game, Saint James had a regular part in the series The Name of the Game, winning an Emmy Award for her role as research assistant Peggy Maxwell in 1969 and establishing her as a popular young actress. The series format, set at a large media company, featured rotating lead characters played by Tony Franciosa, Gene Barry, and Robert Stackgenerally only one of their characters seen each week. Saint James provided a measure of series continuity by appearing as a research assistant at various times to all three.  She appeared in approximately half the episodes, usually in a supporting role, although her Peggy Maxwell was the primary character in the second-season episode "The King of Denmark," alongside Franciosa's "Jeff Dillon".  As well, in the first-season story "Pineapple Rose" (a Gene Barry segment), Saint James was prominently featured when her character was kidnapped in a case of mistaken identity.

In 1967, Saint James had a small part in the pilot episode of the Robert Wagner crime-caper series It Takes a Thief. This led to a recurring role playing a new character, Charlene "Chuck" Brown, Alexander Mundy's fellow thief and "casual" love interest. She was featured in four episodes of the series from 1968 to 1970. She went on to appear in the pilot episode of the western series Alias Smith and Jones (1971).

Then came her first starring role as Rock Hudson's younger supportive wife, Sally McMillan, in the popular, light-hearted crime series, McMillan & Wife (1971–1976), for which she received four Emmy Award nominations.

Saint James left the show due to a contract dispute but went on to further her career as an actress in feature films, such as co-starring with Peter Fonda in the film Outlaw Blues (1977). She achieved significant success in the vampire comedy Love at First Bite (1979) and followed up with a role in the comedy How to Beat the High Cost of Living (1980), co-starring Jessica Lange and Jane Curtin.  Between films, she made a guest appearance in the March 3, 1980, episode of M*A*S*H (episode 192: "War Co-Respondent").  After other film ventures failed to establish her, she returned to television, starring in the comedy series Kate & Allie opposite Jane Curtin from 1984 until 1989. She received three more Emmy Award nominations for this role.

Saint James was a celebrity guest commentator for the World Wrestling Federation's WrestleMania 2 event in 1986 along with Vince McMahon.

In her mid-40s, Saint James retired after Kate & Allie ended.  In addition to motherhood (her second-youngest son was born during the fourth season of Kate & Allie), she has been an active volunteer with the Special Olympics (an organization she began actively supporting in 1972) She has served on the Special Olympics board and was Civitan International's celebrity chairperson for their Special Olympics involvement.  She also is a board member of the Telluride Foundation.

In 1998, Saint James, her sister Mercedes Dewey and friend Barrie Johnson founded "Seedling and Pip", a baby gift basket business. Saint James occasionally has emerged from retirement to appear in television series guest roles, such as the mother of (her real-life niece) Christa Miller in the first season of The Drew Carey Show, and ten years later, as a defense attorney on the February 28, 2006, episode of Law & Order: Special Victims Unit. She also starred in a Warner Theatre (Torrington, Connecticut) 1999 production of The Miracle Worker.  On June 11, 2008, Saint James was honored with a star on the Hollywood Walk of Fame.

Personal life

Saint James married aspiring writer-director Richard Neubert at age 21, but the marriage lasted only a year. She was married a second time in 1971, to Thomas Lucas, a makeup artist. They had a daughter, Sunshine Lucas (born 1972), and a son, Harmony Lucas (born 1974). The marriage ended after six years.

In the late 1970s, during an interview, she stated: "About eight and a half years ago, my husband and I decided to stop eating meat and then about six months later we stopped eating fish. … I had two beautiful births as a vegetarian; they were great labors—no bleeding, no complications, no problems. The diet worked perfectly for me."

While guest-hosting Saturday Night Live in 1981, Saint James met her third husband, then-SNL executive producer Dick Ebersol. They married within the year and had three sons, Charles, William, and Edward (Teddy). In March 2002, Saint James filed for divorce from Ebersol, but the couple reconciled later that summer. Ebersol was chairman of NBC Sports until May 2011.

On November 28, 2004, a private plane carrying Ebersol and two of their sons crashed during an attempted takeoff from Montrose Regional Airport in Colorado. Ebersol and son Charles survived, but son Teddy, age 14, died, as did the pilot Luis Alberto Polanco Espaillet and flight attendant Warren T. Richardson III.  Teddy Ebersol's Red Sox Fields at Lederman Park in Boston is named in memory of Saint James's son, and an episode of the television series Scrubs was dedicated to him.

Saint James is the aunt of actress Christa Miller. She holds honorary degrees from six Connecticut institutions: the University of Connecticut, the University of Bridgeport, Southern Connecticut State University, Albertus Magnus College, the University of New Haven, and Goodwin College. She was a featured speaker at The Women's Conference in 2007, at a session called "Beyond Courage: Overcoming the Unimaginable."

Now retired, Saint James is living a much quieter life and says she never got the “bug to go back” into the business. On June 4, 2021, in the midst of the COVID-19 pandemic, she reunited with her Kate & Allie co-stars Jane Curtin, Frederick Koehler, Allison Smith, Ari Meyers  and director Bill Persky for a live virtual event on Stars in the House.

Filmography

Film

Television films

Television series

References

External links

 
 

1946 births
Living people
20th-century American actresses
21st-century American actresses
American film actresses
American television actresses
American philanthropists
Schools of the Sacred Heart alumni
Actresses from California
Actresses from Illinois
Outstanding Performance by a Supporting Actress in a Drama Series Primetime Emmy Award winners
Survivors of aviation accidents or incidents
Connecticut College alumni
Special Olympics